Kipp is a locality in Alberta, Canada within the Lethbridge County.

Kipp originally began as a trading post called Fort Kipp, which was named after American whiskey trader Joe Kipp. Although not at the same location as the fort, Kipp takes its name from Fort Kipp.

See also 
List of communities in Alberta

References 

Localities in Lethbridge County